The ULPower UL260i is a family of aircraft engines, produced by ULPower in Belgium.

Design
The UL260i series are all lightweight, four-cylinder, four-stroke, horizontally-opposed, air-cooled, direct drive engine designs that feature FADEC with multipoint fuel injection and dual ignition systems.

Variants
UL260i
Base model, fuel injection, compression ratio of 8.16:1, producing 
UL260iS
Model with a higher compression ratio of 9.10:1, fuel injection, producing 
UL260iSA
Aerobatic model with a higher compression ratio of 9.10:1, fuel injection, producing 
UL260iF
Model with a higher compression ratio of 9.10:1, fuel injection, producing , due to French regulatory requirements.

Applications

Specifications

See also
Related development
ULPower UL350i
Lists
 List of aircraft engines
Comparable engines
 HKS 700E
 Jabiru 2200
 KFM 112M
 Pegasus PAL 95
 Revmaster R-2300
 Rotax 912
 Sauer S 2200 UL
 Sauer S 2400 UL
 Sauer S 2100 ULT

References

External links

ULPower aircraft engines
2000s aircraft piston engines